St. Catherine’s Academy is a Catholic internship military school located in Anaheim, California. It was founded in 1889 by The Dominican Sisters of Mission San José. The school offers an academic program for boys in kindergarten through eighth grade, as well as military structure and leadership training. The school is open to both resident and day students.

History
St. Catherine’s Academy was founded by Mother Pia Backes, the foundress of the Dominican Sisters of Mission San Jose. The school was dedicated on March 19, 1889, and opened on March 22, 1889, as an academy for girls and a parochial school for local families. St. Catherine’s also spent time as an orphanage and a school for boys before becoming a military school in the 1920s. The name was changed to St. Catherine's Military School and later St. Catherine's Military Academy. In August 2007, the academy began using its original name, St. Catherine's Academy. The Dominican Sisters continue to be a presence on campus. Today, sisters hold positions in administration, resident care and teaching.

Campus
St. Catherine’s Academy has an  campus in Anaheim, California, two miles (3 km) from Disneyland.  Resident cadets stay in one of four dormitories.

The school’s chapel is the St. Thomas Aquinas Chapel. Decorated by the artist Jan Henryk de Rosen, it is dedicated to the memory of Captain William Maguire, the cadets' chaplain in the 1950s. Maguire was a United States Navy Chaplain to the Pacific Fleet during World War II. He was at Pearl Harbor, preparing to celebrate mass when the Japanese attacked.

Accreditations and memberships
Western Association of Schools and Colleges (WASC)
National Catholic Educational Association (NCEA)
Catholic Boarding Schools Associations (CBSA)
Association of Military Colleges and Schools of the United States (AMCSUS)
International Boys' Schools Coalition (IBSC)

Academics
St. Catherine’s academics adhere to the standards of both the State of California and the Diocese of Orange.

Military tradition
The military program begins for students in second grade. Cadets participate in drill training each afternoon. The military department also takes cadets to a one-week leadership camp  at Camp San Luis Obispo each summer.

Extracurricular activities
St. Catherine’s competes in the Parochial Athletic League (PAL) in three sports: flag football, volleyball and basketball. The school has won championships in all three sports (basketball — 2006-2007; flag football — 2003-2004; volleyball — 2001-2002). The music program is among the oldest ongoing programs in Orange County, with over 70 years in existence. In addition to weekly music classes, students can take individual guitar and piano lessons. The school’s band, The Marching Knights, participates in local parades and concerts.

Popular culture
St Catherine's Academy was used for exterior shots in the 1955 movie The Private War of Major Benson, where cadets filled every role other than the principal roles, including all of the extras as well as many other, insignificant parts.

References

External links
www.stcatherinesacademy.org — school Web site

Educational institutions established in 1889
Boarding schools in California
Catholic boarding schools in the United States
Catholic elementary schools in California
Roman Catholic Diocese of Orange
Education in Orange County, California
Military schools in the United States
Dominican schools in the United States
1889 establishments in California